The  was the original imperial palace of  (present-day Kyoto), then the capital of Japan. Both the palace and the city were constructed in the late 700s and were patterned on Chinese models and designs. The palace served as the imperial residence and the administrative centre for most of the Heian period (794–1185). 

Located in the north-central section of the city, the palace consisted of a large, walled, rectangular Greater Palace (the ), which contained several ceremonial and administrative buildings including the government ministries. Inside this enclosure was the separately walled residential compound of the emperor, or the Inner Palace. In addition to the emperor's living quarters, the Inner Palace contained the residences of the imperial consorts and buildings more closely linked to the person of the emperor.

The original role of the palace was to manifest the centralised government model adopted by Japan from China in the 7th century – known as the  system, where the bureaucracy under the emperor was headed by the great council of state and its subsidiary Eight Ministries. The palace was designed to provide an appropriate setting for the emperor's residence, the conduct of great affairs of state, and the accompanying ceremonies. While the residential function of the palace continued until the 12th century, the facilities built for grand state ceremonies began to fall into disuse by the 9th century. This was due to both the abandonment of several statutory ceremonies and procedures and the transfer of several remaining ceremonies into the smaller-scale setting of the Inner Palace.

From the mid-Heian period, the palace suffered several fires and other disasters. During reconstructions, emperors and some of the office functions resided outside the palace. This, along with the general loss of political power of the court, acted to further diminish the importance of the palace as the administrative centre. In 1227 the palace burned down and was never rebuilt. The site was built over so that almost no trace of it remains. Knowledge of the palace is thus based on contemporary literary sources, surviving diagrams and paintings, and limited excavations.

Location 

The main entrance to the palace was the gate , which formed the northern terminus of the great Suzaku Avenue, which ran through the centre of the city from the gate . A major avenue led to each of the gates, except for the three along the northern side of the palace, which was coterminous with the northern boundary of the city.

The south-eastern corner of the Greater Palace was located in the middle of the present-day Nijō Castle.

History

Early history 

 (approx. 10 kilometers to the south-west of Kyoto), Emperor Kanmu decided to move the capital again, likely due to frequent flooding of the Nagaoka-kyō site. Construction of the palace and imperial family residences was a major expenditure for Kanmu's administration, accounting for the majority of revenues gathered during his reign, according to a 10th-century source. The powerful immigrant Hata family may have influenced and financially supported the decision to move the capital to Heian-kyō, closer to its power base. Later sources claim that the new imperial residence occupied the site of a former Hata leader's residence.

One reason may be the prevalent superstition of the period: uninhabited buildings were avoided for fear of spirits and ghosts, and even the great  compound was thought to be haunted. Hence burglary and even violent crime became a problem within the palace by the first half of 11th century.

Decreasing use 

Fires were a constant problem as the palace compound was constructed almost entirely of wood. The  was destroyed by a fire in 1063 and was never rebuilt. The  was reconstructed after fires in 876, 1068 and in 1156 despite its limited use.

According to historian William H. McCullough, the Dairi fires were frequent enough that arson is "generally assumed". During the periods of rebuilding, the emperors frequently had to stay at their  within the city. Often these secondary palaces were provided by the powerful  family, which especially in the latter part of the Heian period exercised de facto control of politics by providing consorts to successive emperors. Thus the residences of the emperors' maternal grandparents started to usurp the residential role of the palace even before the end of the Heian period. The institution of rule by retired emperors, or the insei system, from 1086 further added to the declining importance of the palace, as retired emperors exercised power from their own residential palaces inside and outside the city.

Late history 
 
In the aftermath of the 1156 Hōgen rebellion, Emperor Go-Shirakawa ordered the rebuilding of portions of the palace as part of an effort to reclaim more power to the emperor and restart some ceremonial practices. Go-Shirakawa soon abdicated in favor of his son, Emperor Nijo, and both were attacked and held captive in the palace during the Heiji rebellion. They escaped a few weeks later, and forces loyal to them retook the palace and ended the rebellion.

After a fire in 1177, the original palace complex was abandoned and emperors resided in smaller palaces (the former ) within the city and villas outside it. In 1334 Emperor Go-Daigo issued an edict to rebuild the Greater Palace, but no resources were available to support this and the project was not completed. 

Though the Heian palace fell into total disuse, Heian-kyō remained the capital until 1868, with the name Kyoto (meaning capital city) applied to it starting in the eleventh century.

Primary sources 

While the palace itself has been completely destroyed, a significant amount of information regarding it has been obtained from contemporary and almost contemporary sources. The Heian Palace figures as a setting in many Heian period literary texts, both fiction and non-fiction. These provide important information on the palace itself, court ceremonies and functions held there and everyday routines of the courtiers living or working there. In addition, paintings in certain  picture scrolls depict (sometimes fictional) scenes that took place at the palace and similar aristocratic dwellings; the Genji Monogatari Emaki, dating from about 1130, is perhaps the best-known example. Modern archaeological study of  the palace site has been hampered by the development of urban Kyoto over the palace ground ruins, but a few parts have been excavated, including the Burakuden.

Greater Palace 

The  was a rectangular walled enclosure situated directly to the north of the  gate in the centre of the southern wall of the Greater Palace. It was based on Chinese models and followed Chinese architectural styles. Archaeological evidence from earlier capital palaces shows a generally stable design from the 7th century onwards.

However, the practice of the morning deliberations ceased by 810 as did the monthly reports.

This was a large (approximately 52 m (170 ft) east to west and 20 m (65 ft) north to south) Chinese-style building with white walls, vermilion pillars and green tiled roofs, intended for most important state ceremonies and functions. The smaller southern section of the  consisted of waiting rooms for senior officials, while the largest middle section
of the compound was occupied by a courtyard surrounded symmetrically by the Twelve Halls, where the bureaucracy assembled for court ceremonies and was seated according to strict order of precedence.

It was built for official celebrations and banquets and used also for other types of entertainment such as archery contests. It was destroyed in at 1063 and not rebuilt. Unlike most of the palace, the Buraku-in site was subjected to some archaeological excavations in the twentieth century.

Other Greater Palace buildings 
The  was built right next to the Inner Palace and used for ceremonies held on the emperor's behalf. Permission to build it inside the palace, granted in 834, shows the influence of the Shingon sect during the early Heian Period.

Inner Palace 

The , or Inner Palace, was located to the north-east of the  somewhat to the east of the central north-south axis of the Greater Palace. Its central feature was the Throne Hall. The  encompassed the emperor's living quarters and the pavilions of the imperial consorts and ladies-in-waiting (collectively, the ). It was enclosed within two sets of walls. In addition to the  itself, the outer walls enclosed some household offices, storage areas, and the —a walled area of Shinto buildings associated with the emperor's religious functions, situated to the west of the  itself, at the geographic centre of the Greater Palace. The formal entrance to the larger enclosure was the gate , located directly south of the Dairi.

It measured approximately 215 m (710 ft) north to south and 170 m (560 ft) east to west. The Inner Palace represented a variant of the shinden-style architecture used in the aristocratic villas and houses of the period. The buildings, with unpainted surfaces and gabled and shingled cypress bark roofs, were raised on elevated wooden platforms and connected to each other with covered and uncovered slightly elevated passages. Between the buildings and passages were gravel yards and small gardens.

It was a rectangular hall measuring approximately 30 m (98 ft) east to west and 25 m (82 ft) north to south. A  orange tree and a cherry tree stood symmetrically on both sides of the front staircase of the building.

It took over much of the intended use of the larger and more formal building from an early date, as the daily business of government ceased to be conducted in the presence of the emperor in the  already at the beginning of the ninth century.

Residences 

It faced a garden in the north and was used for flower-viewing and other banquets before becoming residential space for imperial consorts in the 10th century. It also housed the editorial team of the first imperial waka poetry collection Kokinshū. 

Gradually the  began to be used increasingly for meetings as well, with emperors spending much of their time in this part of the palace.

Other Inner Palace buildings 
Lesser consorts and ladies-in-waiting as well as occasionally some of the crown prince's consorts occupied other buildings of the  further away from the emperor's quarters, i.e., towards north-east. A famous fictional depiction of the spatial status hierarchy concerns the eponymous character's low-ranking mother in The Tale of Genji. However, such distinctions were apparently not always strict. 

See also 
 Architecture of Japan
 Heian period
 Kyoto Imperial Palace

Notes

References 

 

 Mainly Japanese with English summary

 . Originally published in 1964.
 . A reissue of the 1931 ed. published in Hong Kong, with some new illus. and minor changes, under title: Kyoto: its history and vicissitudes since its foundation in 792 to 1868. First published in article form 1925–28.

Further reading 
 
 . First volume of a ten-volume general history of Kyoto.

External links 

 

 Japanese page with interactive map of the Palace
 Page with detailed description of shinden style buildings

8th-century establishments in Japan
Buildings and structures in Kyoto
Imperial residences in Japan
Historic Sites of Japan
Buildings and structures completed in 794
Former palaces in Japan